The following is a list of the squads which competed in the 2007 Toulon Tournament

Players in boldface have been capped at full international level at some point in their career.

Group A

Côte d'Ivoire 

Coach:  Michel Troin

France 
Coach:  Philippe Bergeroo

Germany 
Coach:  Dieter Eilts

Japan 
Coach:  Yasushi Yoshida

Group B

China PR

Ghana

Netherlands 
Coach:  Hans Schrijver

Portugal 
Coach:  Carlos Dinis

References

 2007 edition at Toulon Tournament official website

Squads
Toulon Tournament squads